A general election was held in the U.S. state of Nebraska on November 4, 2014. All of Nebraska's executive officers were up for election as well as a United States Senate seat, and all of Nebraska's three seats in the United States House of Representatives. Primary elections were held on May 13, 2014, for offices that require them.

Governor and Lieutenant Governor

Incumbent Republican Governor Dave Heineman is term-limited and could not run for re-election to a third term.

Republicans Jon Bruning, Tom Carlson, Mike Foley, Beau McCoy, Pete Ricketts and Bryan Slone; Democrat Chuck Hassebrook and Libertarian Mark G. Elworth, Jr. ran.

In Nebraska, gubernatorial nominees select their running mates after the primary elections. The Republican ticket, consisting of Pete Ricketts and Mike Foley, defeated the Democratic ticket of Chuck Hassebrook and Jane Raybould.

Attorney general

Incumbent Republican attorney general Jon Bruning did not run for re-election to a fourth term. He instead ran unsuccessfully for governor.

Republican primary

Candidates
Declared
 Brian C. Buescher, attorney
 Mike Hilgers, attorney and candidate for the state senate in 2012
 Doug Peterson, attorney, former Lincoln County attorney and nephew of Governor of Nebraska Val Peterson
 Pete Pirsch, state senator

Withdrew
 Van Argyrakis, attorney, candidate for attorney general in 2010, for Mayor of Omaha in 2009 and for state senate in 2000
 Jon Bruning, incumbent Nebraska Attorney General (running for governor)

Results

Democratic primary

Candidates
Declared
 Allan Eurek, attorney and nominee for secretary of state in 1994
 Janet Stewart, attorney, candidate for Nebraska's 1st congressional district in 2004 and nominee for Secretary of State of Nebraska in 2010

Results

General election

Results

Secretary of State
Incumbent Republican Secretary of State John A. Gale, who was appointed to the position in December 2000, ran successfully for re-election to a fourth full term in office.

He was challenged by only Libertarian Ben Backus, an IT technician. No Democrat filed to run for the office.

State Treasurer
Incumbent Republican Nebraska State Treasurer Don Stenberg had considered running for governor or the U.S. Senate, but he decided to run for re-election to a second term.

He faced Christopher Costello in the Republican primary.

Democrat Michael J. O'Hara, former Omaha Public Power District Director, and Libertarian Michael Knebel also ran.

Auditor of Public Accounts
Incumbent Republican auditor of public accounts of Nebraska Mike Foley did not run for re-election to a third term. He instead ran unsuccessfully for governor, instead becoming the Republican nominee for lieutenant governor.

Republican primary

Candidates
Declared
 Larry Anderson, member of the State Auditor's office
 Charlie Janssen, state senator

Withdrew
 Pete Pirsch, state senator (running for attorney general)

Declined
 Mike Foley, incumbent auditor of public accounts (running for governor)

Results

Democratic primary

Candidates
Declared
 Amanda McGill, state senator

Public Service Commission
One of the five seats on the Nebraska Public Service Commission was up for election. District 2 incumbent Democrat Anne C. Boyle, who was first elected in 1996, retired rather than run for re-election to a fourth term. The district is based in Omaha.

Democratic primary

Candidates
Declared
 Jim Esch, businessman and nominee for Nebraska's 2nd congressional district in 2006 and 2008
 John Green, member of the Omaha Public Power District Board of Directors
 Crystal Rhoades, Juvenile Detention Alternatives Initiatives co-ordinator for Douglas County and member of the Metropolitan Community College Board of Governors

Declined
 Anne C. Boyle, incumbent Public Service Commissioner and nominee for lieutenant governor in 2010

Results

Republican primary

Candidates
Declared
 John Sieler, member of the Nebraska State Board of Education

United States Senate

Incumbent Republican senator Mike Johanns did not run for re-election to a second term. Republicans Sid Dinsdale, Clifton Johnson, Bart McLeay, Shane Osborn and Ben Sasse; Democrats David Domina and Larry Marvin and Independents Jim Jenkins and Todd Watson ran.

Republican Ben Sasse defeated Democrat David Domina to win the seat.

United States House of Representatives

All of Nebraska's three seats in the United States House of Representatives were up for election in 2014.

References

 
Nebraska